Molemole Local Municipality, is located in the Capricorn District Municipality, of Limpopo province, South Africa. The seat of Molemole Local Municipality is Mogwadi.

Main places
The 2001 census divided the municipality into the following main places:

Politics 
The municipal council consists of thirty-two members elected by mixed-member proportional representation. Sixteen councillors are elected by first-past-the-post voting in sixteen wards, while the remaining sixteen are chosen from party lists so that the total number of party representatives is proportional to the number of votes received. In the election of 3 August 2016 the African National Congress (ANC) won a majority of twenty-three seats on the council.
The following table shows the results of the election.

References

External links
 Official homepage

Local municipalities of the Capricorn District Municipality